Jurisdicción de Lara is a municipality in the province of Burgos, Castile and León, Spain. It had a population of 59 at the 2004 census (INE).

The municipality is made up of three towns: Lara de los Infantes (seat or capital), Aceña de Lara and Paúles de Lara.

References 

Municipalities in the Province of Burgos